Quiet may refer to:
 Silence, a relative or total lack of sound

In music
 The Quiett (born 1985), South Korean rapper
 Quiet (album), a 1996 John Scofield album
 "Quiet", a song by Lights, from her album The Listening (2009)
 "Quiet" (MILCK song), a 2017 song written for the 2017 Women's March in Washington, D.C.
 Quiet (EP), a 2007 EP by Jim Ward
 "Quiet" (This Will Destroy You song), 2006
 "Quiet" (Lil' Kim song), a song by Lil' Kim
 "Quiet", a song by Alien Ant Farm, from their 2003 albumTruant
 "Quiet", a song by Demi Lovato, from her album Here We Go Again (2009)
 "Quiet", a song by The Smashing Pumpkins, from their album Siamese Dream (1993)
 "Quiet", a song by the Player Piano from their album Satellite (2007)
 "Quiet", a song by Royce da 5'9", from his album Layers (2016)
 The Quiet, an album by Bella Morte
 "Quiet", a song by Tim Minchin from the musical Matilda

In religion
 Prayer of Quiet, a term from Christian theology relating to degrees of contemplation or contemplative prayer
 Quietism (Christian philosophy)
 Quiet Time

Other
 QUIET (abbreviation for "Q/U Imaging ExperimenT"), an astronomy experiment studying polarization of the cosmic microwave background radiation
 QUIET telescope, an instrument for use in the QUIET astronomy experiment
 Quiet: The Power of Introverts in a World That Can't Stop Talking, a 2012 non-fiction book about introversion by American author Susan Cain
 The Quiet, a 2005 American drama thriller film directed by Jamie Babbit
 Quiet game, a children's "game" where children must stay quiet and still, on fear of punishment
 Quiet (Metal Gear), a character in the videogame Metal Gear Solid V: The Phantom Pain

See also
 Quiet American (disambiguation)
 Quiet Revolution (disambiguation)
 Silence (disambiguation)